Nalloorkonam is a small village that belongs to Arumanai panchayat of Kanyakumari district in Tamil Nadu, India. The village has a number of rubber plantations in addition to ponds, springs and a variety of flora and fauna. Farming is the primary occupation in the village. Rainfall occurs throughout the year and ground water is abundant. The village has a temple named Ayanimoottu thamburan.

History
The village's history dates back to the Medieval Ages. Around 15 years back, many burial places were unearthed in this area. (Mudhu Makkal Thazhi) This event is as yet unpublished.

Kanyakumari